Meera, better known as Mirabai and venerated as Sant Meerabai, was a 16th-century Hindu mystic poet and devotee of Krishna. She is a celebrated Bhakti saint, particularly in the North Indian Hindu tradition.

Mirabai was born into a Rathore Rajput royal family in Kudki (modern-day Pali district of Rajasthan) and spent her childhood in Merta. She is mentioned in Bhaktamal, confirming that she was widely known and a cherished figure in the Bhakti movement culture by about 1600 CE. 

Most legends about Mirabai mention her fearless disregard for social and family conventions, her devotion to Krishna, her treating Krishna as her husband and being persecuted by her in-laws for her religious devotion. She has been the subject of numerous folk tales and hagiographic legends, which are inconsistent or widely different in details. 

Millions of devotional hymns in passionate praise of Krishna are attributed to Meerabai in the Indian tradition, but just a few hundred are believed to be authentic by scholars, and the earliest written records suggest that except for two hymns, most were written down only in the 18th century. Many poems attributed to Meera were likely composed later by others who admired Meera. These hymns are a type of bhajan, and are very famous across India. 

Hindu temples, such as in Chittorgarh fort, are dedicated to Mirabai's memory. Legends about Mirabai's life, of contested authenticity, have been the subject of movies, films, comic strips and other popular literature in modern times.

Biography

Authentic records about Meera are not available and scholars have attempted to establish Meera's biography from secondary literature that mentions her and wherein dates and other moments. Meera unwillingly married Bhoj Raj, the crown prince of Mewar, in 1516. Her husband was wounded in one of the ongoing wars with the Delhi Sultanate in 1518, and he died of battle wounds in 1521. Both her father and father-in-law (Rana Sanga) died a few days after their defeat in the Battle of Khanwa against first Mughal Emperor Babur.

After the death of her father-in-law Rana Sanga, Vikram Singh became the ruler of Mewar. According to a popular legend, her in-laws tried many times to assassinate her, such as sending Meera a glass of poison and telling her it was nectar or sending her a basket with a snake instead of flowers. According to the hagiographic legends, she was not harmed in either case, with the snake miraculously becoming a Krishna idol (or a garland of flowers depending on the version). In another version of these legends, she is asked by Vikram Singh to go drown herself, which she tries but she finds herself floating on water. Yet another legend states that the third Mughal emperor Akbar came with Tansen to visit Meera and presented a pearl necklace, but scholars doubt this ever happened because Tansen joined Akbar's court in 1562, 15 years after she died.
Similarly, some stories state that Guru Ravidas  was her guru (teacher), but there is no corroborating historical evidence for this. Some versions suggest this could likely have happened. Others disagree.

The three different oldest records are known as of 2014 that mention Meera, all from the 17th century and written within 150 years of Meera's death, neither mention anything about her childhood or circumstances of her marriage to Bhojraj nor do they mention that the people who persecuted her were her in-laws or from some Rajput royal family. Nancy Martin-Kershaw states that to the extent that Meera was challenged and persecuted, religious or social conventions were unlikely to have been the cause, rather the likely cause was political chaos and military conflicts between the Rajput kingdom and the Mughal Empire.

Other stories state that Mira Bai left the kingdom of Mewar and went on pilgrimages. In her last years, Meera lived in Dwarka or Vrindavan, where legends state she miraculously disappeared by merging into an idol of Krishna in 1547. While miracles are contested by scholars for the lack of historical evidence, it is widely acknowledged that Meera dedicated her life to Lord Krishna, composing songs of devotion, and was one of the most important poet-saint of the Bhakti movement period.

Poetry

A number of compositions by Meera Bai continue to be sung today in India, mostly as devotional songs (bhajans) though nearly all of them have a philosophical connotation. One of her most popular compositions remains "Payoji maine Ram Ratan dhan payo" (पायो जी मैंने राम रतन धन पायो।, "I have been given the richness of Lord's name blessing"). Meera's poems are lyrical padas (metric verses) in Rajasthani language. While thousands of verses are attributed to her, scholars are divided in their opinion as to how many of them were actually penned by Meera herself. There are no surviving manuscripts of her poetry from her time and the earliest records with two poems credited to her are from early 18th-century, more than 150 years after she immersed into the statue of Dwarkadhish at Dwarka Temple.

Hindi and Rajasthani

The largest collection of poems credited to her are in 19th-century manuscripts. Scholars have attempted to establish authenticity based on both the poem and Meera being mentioned in other manuscripts as well as from style, linguistics and form. John Stratton Hawley cautions, "When one speaks of the poetry of Mirabai, then, there is always an element of enigma. (...) there must always remain a question about whether there is any real relation between the poems we cite and a historical Mira."

In her poems, Krishna is a yogi and lover, and she herself is a yogini ready to take her place by his side into a spiritual marital bliss. Meera's style combines impassioned mood, defiance, longing, anticipation, joy and ecstasy of union, always centred on Krishna.

Meera speaks of a personal relationship with Krishna as her lover, lord and mountain lifter. (Sanson Ki Mala Pe Simru Main pi Ka Naam) is written by Meera Bai Shows her dedication towards Krishna.The characteristic of her poetry is complete surrender.

Meera is often classed with the northern Sant bhaktis who spoke of Lord Sri Krishna.

Sikh literature

When the Adi Granth was compiled in 1604, a copy of the text was given to a Sikh named Bhai Banno who was instructed by Guru Arjan to travel to Lahore to get it bound. While doing so, he made a copy of the codex which included compositions of Mirabai. These unauthorized additions were not included in the standardized edition of the scripture by the Sikh gurus, whom rejected their inclusion.

Prem Ambodh Pothi, a text attributed to Guru Gobind Singh and completed in 1693 CE, includes poetry of Mira Bai as one of sixteen historic bhakti saints important to Sikhism.

Mirabai's compositions 

 Raag Govind
 Govind Tika
 Raag Soratha
 Meera Ki Malhar 
 Mira Padavali
 Narsi ji Ka Mayara
 Sanson Ki Mala Pe

Influence

Scholars acknowledge that Meera was one of the central poet-saints of the Bhakti movement which was during a difficult period in Indian history filled with religious conflicts. Yet, they simultaneously question the extent to which Meera was a canonical projection of social imagination that followed, where she became a symbol of people's suffering and a desire for an alternative. Dirk Wiemann, quoting Parita Mukta, states,

The continued influence of Meera, in part, has been her message of freedom, her resolve and right to pursue her devotion to deity Krishna and her spiritual beliefs as she felt drawn to despite her persecution. Her appeal and influence in Indian culture, writes Edwin Bryant, is from her emerging, through her legends and poems, as a person "who stands up for what is right and suffers bitterly for holding fast to her convictions, as other men and women have", yet she does so with a language of love, with words painting the "full range of emotions that mark love, whether between human beings or between human and divine".

English versions
Aliston and Subramanian have published selections with English translation in India. Schelling and Landes-Levi have offered anthologies in the USA. Snell has presented parallel translations in his collection The Hindi Classical Tradition. Sethi has selected poems which Mira composed presumably after she came in contact with Saint Ravidas. and Meera Pakeerah.

Some bhajans of Meera have been rendered into English by Robert Bly and Jane Hirshfield as Mirabai: Ecstatic Poems.

Popular culture

Composer John Harbison adapted Bly's translations for his Mirabai Songs. There is a documentary film A Few Things I Know About Her by Indian film director Anjali Panjabi. 

Two well-known films of her life have been made in India, Meera (1945), a Tamil language film starring M. S. Subbulakshmi, and Meera a 1979 Hindi film by Gulzar. Other Indian films about her include: Meerabai (1921) by Kanjibhai Rathod, Sant Mirabai (1929) by Dhundiraj Govind Phalke, Rajrani Meera/Meerabai (1933) by Debaki Bose, Meerabai (1936) by T. C. Vadivelu Naicker and A. Narayanan, Sadhvi Meerabai (1937) by Baburao Painter, Bhakta Meera (1938) by Y. V. Rao, Meerabai (1940) by Narasimha Rao Bhimavarapu, Meera (1947) by Ellis Dungan, Matwali Meera (1947) by Baburao Patel, Meerabai (1947) by W. Z. Ahmed, Meerabai (1947) by Nanabhai Bhatt, Girdhar Gopal Ki Mira (1949) by Prafulla Roy, Raj Rani Meera (1956) by G. P. Pawar, Meera Shyam (1976), Meera Ke Girdhar (1992) by Vijay Deep.

A 26  episodes popular series starring Mrinal Kulkarni  was produced by UTV in 1997 based on her life called Mirabai.

Meera, a 2009 Indian television series based on her life aired on NDTV Imagine.

The novel Cuckold by Kiran Nagarkar features her as one of the central characters.
 
Shree Krishna Bhakto Meera, a 2021 Indian Bengali mythological television series based on her life is currently airing on Star Jalsha.

Meera Bai's life has been interpreted as a musical story in Meera—The Lover…, a music album based on original compositions for some well known Meera bhajans, released 11 October 2009.

The Meera Mahal in Merta is a museum dedicated to telling the story of Mirabai through sculptures, paintings, displays and a shaded garden.

Adaptations 
Out of all serials made on Meerabai, however the 1997 serial Meerabai by Ved Rahi starring Mrinal Kulkarni was more true to life of Meera and the most popular one. It has  more than 30 raag based classical bhajans composed by Mohinderjit Singh and sung by Sandhya Rao, Kavita Krishnamurthy and many others. Its title track was sung by 40 chorus singers, the highest till today.

See also
 Andal
 Akka Mahadevi
 Bhajan

References

Further reading
 Robert Bly and Jane Hirshfield (2004), Mirabai: Ecstatic Poems, Beacon Press, 
 Chaturvedī, Ācārya Parashurām(a), Mīrāŉbāī kī padāvalī,(16. edition)
 Goetz, Hermann, Mira Bai: Her Life and Times, Bombay 1966
 Levi, Louise Landes. Sweet on My Lips. The Love Poems of Mira Bai.  Cool Grove PrBrooklyn NY,1997,2003,2016
 Mirabai: Liebesnärrin. Die Verse der indischen Dichterin und Mystikerin. Translated from Rajasthani into German by Shubhra Parashar. Kelkheim, 2006
 Hawley, John Stratton. The Bhakti Voices: Mirabai, Surdas, and Kabir in Their Times and Ours, Oxford 2005.
 Sethi, V.K.: Mira—The Divine Lover; Radha Soami Satsang Beas, Punjab, India; 1988

External links

Mīrābāī and Her Contributions to the Bhakti Movement, S. M. Pandey and Norman Zide (1965), History of Religions, Vol. 5, No. 1, pages 54–73
Mirabai in Rajasthan, Parita Mukta (1989)
Feminist and Non-Western Perspectives in the Music Theory Classroom: A Study of John Harbison's "Mirabai Songs, Amy Carr-Richardson (2002), College Music Symposium, Vol. 42, pages 20–36
Without Kṛṣṇa There Is No Song, David Kinsley (1972), History of Religions, Vol. 12, No. 2, pages 149-180
"By the Sweetness of the Tongue": Duty, Destiny, and Devotion in the Oral Life Narratives of Female Sādhus in Rajasthan, Antoinette E. DeNapoli (2009), Asian Ethnology, Vol. 68, No. 1, pages 81–109

1498 births
1547 deaths
Hindu female religious leaders
16th-century Hindu religious leaders
Hindi-language poets
Indian women religious leaders
People related to Krishna
Ravidassia
Hindu mystics
Indian women poets
Devotees of Krishna
Bhakti movement
People from Pali district
16th-century Indian poets
Poets from Rajasthan
Women writers from Rajasthan
Indian Hindu saints
Scholars from Rajasthan
Women educators from Rajasthan
Educators from Rajasthan
Women musicians from Rajasthan
Singers from Rajasthan
16th-century Indian women singers
16th-century Indian singers
Women mystics

Rajput princesses 
Indian princesses